Pararin District is one of ten districts of the Recuay Province in Peru.

References

Districts of the Recuay Province
Districts of the Ancash Region